Sing! is a 2001 American short documentary film about the Los Angeles Children's Chorus, directed by Freida Lee Mock. It was nominated for an Academy Award for Best Documentary Short.

Awards and nominations

See also
 List of documentary films
 List of American films of 2001

References

External links

Sing! at the American Film Foundation

2001 films
2001 short documentary films
American short documentary films
American independent films
Films directed by Freida Lee Mock
Documentary films about singers
Documentary films about Los Angeles
Music of Los Angeles
2001 independent films
2000s English-language films
2000s American films